Streets of Gold is the third studio album by American electronic music duo 3OH!3. It was released on June 29, 2010 in the United States and July 19, 2010 in the United Kingdom. The album debuted at number seven on the US Billboard 200, selling 41,000 copies in its first week. Upon its release, Streets of Gold received generally mixed reviews from most music critics.

Background 
3OH!3 released a video for the song "House Party" on April 8 as a teaser for Streets of Gold. The group hired Andrew W.K. to do a rock remix of "House Party", which was released virally on Friday April 16, 2010. 3OH!3 had met Andrew W.K. at a house party in Memphis, Tennessee. First single, "My First Kiss" was released on their website at 3:03 PM EST May 3. and digitally at midnight on May 4. On May 18, 2010, the song "Touchin' on My" was released exclusively on iTunes Store. 3OH!3 planned to release a new song every other Tuesday up to the release of the album. "Déjà Vu" was released on June 1, and "Double Vision" was released on June 15. On June 8, the song "I Can Do Anything" was released to members only on the 3OH!3 website.
The song "I Know How To Say" was used in a trailer for the animated Disney film Mars Needs Moms. An excerpt from the instrumental version of the song can be heard on the official Mars Needs Moms website.

Critical reception 

The album received mixed reviews from most music critics. At Metacritic, which assigns a normalized rating out of 100 to reviews from mainstream critics, the album has received an average score of 48, based on 11 reviews, which indicates "generally mixed or average reviews". AllMusic writer David Jeffries noted "over-the-top performances" and stated "3OH!3 are nothing if not loud and shameless, so if you expect end-to-end excellence from their albums, you’ve got a lot to learn about cheap thrills". Entertainment Weeklys Leah Greenblatt gave the album a C+ rating and wrote that "Streets of Golds beats still sound garage-sale-Casio cheap, but the album yields several doofy, affable sing-alongs". Jon Caramanica of The New York Times complimented its incorporation of hip hop, rock, and electro-pop styles and described it as "an oppressive and convincing wall of sounds". Alternative Press gave the album 4 out of 5 stars and wrote that it "sweeps across a broad range of stylistic tones, maintaining levity while dabbling in comparably serious musical pursuits". The Washington Posts Sean Fennessey called 3OH!3 "cheeky stylists with quips that frequently devolve into misogyny" and noted "little depth", but concluded "Still, this is a group that excels when no one is listening to what they're saying, only to how they sound, which is always committed and fearlessly grand".

In contrast, BBC Online's Fraser McAlpine panned the album's lyrics and called it "dumb for sure, but no fun whatsoever". Ben Weisz of MusicOMH gave it 2 out of 5 stars and stated "the lyrics are generally unimaginative, sacrificing any shred of credibility to chase the cheap rhyme". Stacey Anderson of Spin criticized the songs' "witticisms" and noted "brutish synths and hammy bleats". Giving it 1 out of 5 stars, Jody Rosen of Rolling Stone called it "grim stuff – a soundtrack for beer-pong tournaments" and panned its formula of "dopey electro rock bolstering 'raps' about drinking... and getting girls to 'touch on' their privates". NMEs Mark Beaumont gave the album a 0/10 rating and called 3OH!3 "electro-hip-pop white bread American scum", stating "If Streets Of Golds lyrics are unlikely to bother the Nobel committee, musically 3OH!3 are a boyband pendulum: the threat of the latter tamed and glossed by the cash-hungry urge to be the former".

Commercial performance 
Streets of Gold debuted at number seven on the Billboard 200 with 41,000 copies sold in its first week. The album has sold more than 100,000 copies in US.

Track listing

Personnel
Credits for Streets of Gold adapted from AllMusic.

Musicians

3OH!3
Nathaniel Motte – vocals, composer, drums, keyboards, programming
Sean Foreman – vocals, composer

Guest musicians
Kesha – vocals on track 3
Katy Perry – vocals on track 16

Production

Benny Blanco – drums, keyboards, programming, vocals, backing vocals, producer, engineer, musician
Joseph Cultice – photography
Megan Dennis – production coordination
Dr. Luke – programming, vocals, producer, musician
Chris Gehringer – material
Serban Ghenea – mixing
Larry Goetz – assistant
Aniela Gottwald – assistant
Tatiana Gottwald – assistant
John Hanes – mixing
Sam Holland – engineer

Jimmy James – production assistant
Andrew Kimmell – artwork
Greg Kurstin – guitars, keyboards, programming, producer, engineer, mixing
Jeremy "J Boogs" Levin – assistant
Nicholas Motte – artwork
Michelle Piza – packaging manager
Irene Richter – production coordination
Tim Roberts – mixing assistant
Vanessa Silberman – production coordination
Matt Squire – guitar, drums, keyboards, programming, producer, engineer, mixing, vocal editing
Steve Tippeconic – tambourine, assistant
Emily Wright – engineer, vocal editing

Charts

Weekly charts

Year-end charts

References

2010 albums
3OH!3 albums
Albums produced by Benny Blanco
Albums produced by Dr. Luke
Albums produced by Greg Kurstin
Atlantic Records albums
Photo Finish Records albums